Line S9 is a north–south suburban line in the Nanjing Metro system, which opened on December 30, 2017.

Line S9 also serves as the second stage of the Nanjing–Gaochun Intercity Railway, with Line S1 serving as the first stage.

Opening timetable

Station list

Rolling Stock 
Line S9 uses car B-type aluminum alloy trains with a maximum service speed of 120 km/h. The train cars are 2.8 meters wide with a transverse 2+2 seating layout, with 151 seats and a capacity of 441 people.

References

External links 
Line S9 on the official Nanjing Metro website (includes route map) 

Nanjing Metro lines
Railway lines opened in 2017